Newcastle City Library (also known as the Charles Avison Building) is a library in the city centre of Newcastle upon Tyne, United Kingdom. Completed on 3 March 2009, the building opened on 7 June 2009, and is the city's main public library. The main feature of the building is a long 'glass box' forming the eastern side of the steel frame structure.

Replacing the old building 
The city's central library has been on this site since Victorian times, with the original building demolished in the 1960s to make way for a concrete and steel structure designed by Sir Basil Spence situated on the corner of John Dobson Street and New Bridge Street West, which opened in 1968. The neighbouring Laing Art Gallery had originally been built as an extension of the old Victorian library and was left somewhat out of context following the demolition of the older building, with a blank brick wall facing towards the city centre.

The 1960s building rapidly became unfit for the purpose of a modern public library with its name changing in the late 1990s from Central Library to City Library. Additionally, the 1960s design of the library became regarded as exceedingly ugly, with local TV presenter and author John Grundy describing it as "a monstrous concrete blob". The road to the rear of the library, John Dobson Street, used to have a concrete canopy which hung over the dual carriageway stretching from Durant Road up to the junction of New Bridge Street West. This canopy was at the official ground floor level of the library and provided the library with an entrance to the rear with access onto which was ultimately a rather unused large pedestrian area with seats and other street furniture. In the late 1990s the canopy was demolished back to the Bewick Court high rise block of flats which resulted in the rear-facing entrance becoming redundant, as it had nothing to connect to and became a balcony.

The library was closed on 1 September 2006, and demolished from April to July 2007. The foundation stone marking the construction of the new library was ceremonially laid by the Mayor on 17 December 2007. The Poet Laureate Andrew Motion was guest of honour at the handover of the new building from the contractors to the City Council on 3 March 2009.  The new building is situated directly on top of the old building, which resulted in the closure of the 'Dobsons' Bar which utilised the lower ground floor area (which opened onto New Bridge Street West directly).

The new building 
It is named the Charles Avison Building after the 18th-century Newcastle composer. It was dedicated on 21 June 2009.

The opening day, 7 June 2009, featured a programme of entertainment from musicians performing in the entrance hall and fictional characters including Captain Hook, Sherlock Holmes, Alice in Wonderland, The Queen of Hearts, The Gruffalo and Peter Rabbit. The six-storey building contains a marble-floored atrium, a viewing platform, a 185-seat performance space, a café and an exhibition space.  Construction cost was £24 million.

It was officially opened by Her Majesty The Queen and His Royal Highness The Duke of Edinburgh on 6 November 2009.

When it first opened the new building used technologies specifically designed for use in libraries. It was an early adopter of RFID library tagging technology. Every book is fitted with a digital tag, meaning books can be checked out and returned via automated checkout points, and theft of stock becomes much harder. Staff members carry hands-free voice-activated WiFi radios to communicate with other members of staff, a first in the UK.

The library is included in scenes in the film I, Daniel Blake, where the eponymous character upon losing his life long job as a builder goes to the library to get online to apply for welfare benefits.

References

External links 

 City Library (Libraries in Newcastle) on Newcastle Council website
 Newcastle Libraries on TikTok
 Newcastle City Library at Kajima Projects
 
 
 
 

Public libraries in Tyne and Wear
Buildings and structures in Newcastle upon Tyne
Glass architecture
Government buildings completed in 2009
Library buildings completed in 2009